Demographic momentum is the tendency for growing populations to continue growing after a fertility decline because of their young age distribution. This is important because once this happens a country moves to a different stage in the demographic transition model.

Phenomenon
Even in the face of extreme measures aimed at lowering reproductive rates, the population will continue to grow due to a large proportion of its population entering its reproductive years.

For example, when China first introduced the one-child policy, population growth continued regardless.  Even though the number of children born reduced dramatically, the sheer number of maturing youth was significant.  In 1979 when the one-child policy entered into force, the number of people becoming adults was based on the number of births around the 1950s, not 1979. As a result, the Chinese population maintained the same momentum of increase as for the past 20 years.  It is only now that the Chinese population has reached a somewhat stabilized population growth.

See also
Population momentum

Population